Xiao Yi or Xiaoyi may refer to:

YI Technology, also known as Xiao Yi

People
 Xiao Yi of Shang ( 12th century BC), a king of the Shang dynasty
 Xiao Yi (508–555), personal name of Emperor Yuan of Liang
 Shiao Yi (1935–2018) or Xiao Yi, Chinese wuxia novelist
 Xiao Yi (born 1962), Chinese politician, vice chairman of the Jiangxi Provincial Committee of the Chinese People's Political Consultative Conference

Places in China
 Xiaoyi, city in Shanxi
 Xiaoyi, Guangxi (校椅), town in Heng County, Guangxi
 Xiaoyi, Shaanxi (孝义), town in Weinan, Shaanxi
 Xiaoyi, Wenshui County (孝义), town in Wenshui County, Shanxi
 Xiaoyi Township (小伊乡), township in Guanyun County, Jiangsu
 Xiaoyi Subdistrict (孝义街道), subdistrict in Gongyi, Henan